The AMA Pro Daytona Sportbike Championship was a motorcycle racing series run by AMA Pro Racing. The category was similar to the Formula Xtreme class, allowing a wide range of engine types and displacements.

The flagship race for the series was the Daytona 200, held at the Daytona International Speedway.

Champions

See also
 AMA Superbike Championship
 AMA Supersport Championship

References

External links
About AMA Pro Daytona Sportbike

 
Motorcycle road racing series